CNRC may refer to:

 Cajal Neuroscience Research Center
 Cascadia Natural Resource Consultants
 Centre National du Registre du Commerce
 Children's Nutrition Research Center
 Clinical Nutrition Research Center 
 Columbia Network Research Center
 Council of National Resource Centers, a group of U.S. universities which host National Resource Centers for international studies
 National Research Council of Canada (French acronym)
 Commander of the United States Navy Recruiting Command